Victor Mees (26 January 1927 – 11 November 2012), nicknamed Vic or Vicky, was a Belgian footballer who played all of his career at Royal Antwerp.

Club career
Mees was born in Antwerp.  He made his first team debut at the age of 17, just after World War II. Mees, who had become a leader of the team, won its first Championship title in 1957, having won the Belgian Cup two years before.

International career
Known as a gentleman footballer, Mees was at the time a pillar of the national team. In total, Mees made 68 appearances and he played in the 1954 World Cup.

Awards
He won the Belgian Golden Shoe in 1956 while at Antwerp. In 2002, he was voted Antwerp player of the century.

Honours

Player 
Royal Antwerp

 Belgian First Division: 1956–57
 Belgian Cup: 1954–55

Individual 

 Belgian Golden Shoe: 1956
 Royal Antwerp Player of the Century (2002)
 Former Belgium's Most Capped Player: 1958–1973 (68 caps)

References

External links

Profile - FC Antwerp

1927 births
2012 deaths
Footballers from Antwerp
Belgian footballers
Belgium international footballers
1954 FIFA World Cup players
Royal Antwerp F.C. players
Belgian Pro League players
Association football midfielders